Addisu Arega Kitessa is an Ethiopian official, elected office holder and a politician. He currently is the head of ODP Central Committee Office (one of the largest political parties in Ethiopia). ODP is of the four parties that form the EPRDF coalition that is the ruling party in Ethiopia.

He has served in various positions as an elected official including as deputy minister in Government Communications Affairs Office.

References

Living people
Oromo Democratic Party politicians
Year of birth missing (living people)
Place of birth missing (living people)